Cementon is an unincorporated area and census-designated place (CDP) in Lehigh County, Pennsylvania. As of the 2020 census, the population of Cementon was 1,657. Cementon is part of the Lehigh Valley metropolitan area, which had a population of 861,899 and was the 68th most populous metropolitan area in the U.S. as of 2020. It uses the Whitehall Township ZIP Code of 18052.

Geography
Cementon is in northeastern Lehigh County, Pennsylvania situated along the Lehigh River across from Northampton in Northampton County. It is bordered to the west by the unincorporated community of Egypt. Pennsylvania Route 329 passes through the center of Cementon, crossing the Lehigh east into Northampton and leading west through Egypt to Neffs. Pennsylvania Route 145 forms the western boundary of Cementon, crossing PA 329 in the Eagle Point neighborhood. PA 145 leads northwest  to Walnutport and south to the center of Allentown. The town is part of the Delaware River watershed.

History

Cementon was originally known as "Siegfried's Ferry" as it is located directly across the Lehigh River from Siegfried, one of the three villages that would merge to become Northampton in 1902. In 1828, a bridge was built across the river, and the town became known as Siegfried's Bridge. After a large Whitehall Portland Cement Works quarry and mill were established in 1900-01, the town was renamed "Cementon".

Education
Cementon is part of the Whitehall-Coplay School District. Students in grades nine through 12 attend Whitehall High School.

References

Notes

Census-designated places in Lehigh County, Pennsylvania
Census-designated places in Pennsylvania